This is a list of flag bearers who have represented Netherlands Antilles at the Olympics.

Flag bearers carry the national flag of their country at the opening ceremony of the Olympic Games.

See also
Netherlands Antilles at the Olympics
List of flag bearers for Aruba at the Olympics

References

Netherlands Antilles at the Olympics
Netherlands Antilles
Olympic flagbearers